is a Japanese former Nippon Professional Baseball pitcher.

References 

1961 births
Living people
Baseball people from Kyoto Prefecture 
Japanese baseball players
Nippon Professional Baseball pitchers
Hiroshima Toyo Carp players
Kintetsu Buffaloes players
Japanese baseball coaches
Nippon Professional Baseball coaches